The SY class 2-8-2 Mikado is one of the main industrial locomotives used by China Railways built mostly by Tangshan Railway Vehicle between 1960 and 1999.

History and design 
The SY class was the last major class of steam locomotives to be produced anywhere in the world with the last one built in 1999. The design, however, is based on the earlier Japanese-built JF6 Class 2-8-2s which itself was based on a locomotive type built by the American Locomotive Company in the 1920s for use in Korea. What was contrasting from the JF6 Class was that the SYs were fitted with airhorns (like many other powerful steam locomotives), frequently blown as a warning; or else the operators of the class enjoyed sounding the airhorns more than blowing the whistles, as they found loud signal sounds more useful.

The SYs are one of the few steam locomotives still found in active service in the 21st century, mostly working in coal and steel industries but can also be found heading commuter trains from time to time.

The last steam locomotive built in China was SY1772, completed at the very beginning of the 21st century.

Export
The SY class was also among the few Chinese steam locomotives to be exported to the United States. In 1989 and 1991, three SYs were constructed for tourist railroads in the United States, SY1647m ('M' ) for the Valley Railroad and SY1658m for the Knox and Kane Railroad were built in 1989 at a cost of $300,000, with a third being built in 1991 for the New York, Susquehanna and Western Railway. This third one was lost at sea during shipment in the Indian Ocean when the ship it was on sunk during the 1991 North Indian Ocean cyclone season.

The Susquehanna later purchased SY1647m from the Valley Railroad, renumbering it 142. The 142 ran throughout the NYS&W system until its transfer to the New York Susquehanna & Western Technical & Historical Society in 2003 and now operates on the Belvidere and Delaware River Railway in Phillipsburg, New Jersey. SY1658m was renumbered 58 in the mid to late 1990s. After the main draw of the Knox and Kane Railroad, the Kinzua Bridge collapsed in mid 2003, the 58 was withdrawn from service and moved with other equipment to an engine house in Kane, Pennsylvania. On the morning of 16 March 2008, the 58 was damaged when the engine house it was stored in was burned by arson. The 58 was purchased later that year by the Valley Railroad at an auction. Upon purchase, the 58 was renumbered 3025 and was given a complete rebuild which included cosmetic alterations to make it resemble a New Haven 2-8-2.

One was bought by the Korean National Railroad in 1994, numbered 901, and operated for excursion trains. It has been out of service since 2012.

Preservation 

SY-0017: is preserved at Fangzi Coal Mine Heritage Park, Weifang.
SY-0024: is preserved at Maanshan Iron & Steel Co.,Ltd.
SY-0051: is preserved at Hubei Huangshi National Mine Park.
SY-0053: is preserved at Maanshan Iron & Steel Co., Ltd.
SY-0057: is preserved at Dalian Software Park.
SY-0072: is preserved at Lingyuan Iron and Steel Group Corporation.
SY-0192: is preserved at the Former Guizhou-Guangxi Railway Bridge, Chengbei New District, Duyun.
SY-0194: is preserved at Lanzhou JiaoTong University.
SY-0223: is preserved at Changchun Park.
SY-0232: is preserved at Yakeshi Railway Station.
SY-0309: is preserved at Dashanzi Art District, Beijing.
SY-0320: is preserved at  Panzhihua Third-line Construction Museum.
SY-0359: is preserved at Shanghai Junior College of Tourism
SY-0368: is preserved at Gourmet Mansion in Nanjing.
SY-0381: is preserved at Discovery Park, Hengyang.
SY-0386: is preserved at ? on static display.
SY-0388: is preserved at Yunnan Railway Museum.
SY-0405: is preserved at Liupanshui Third-line Construction Museum.
SY-0427: is preserved at Tianjin Haijin Bridge Park.
SY-0452: is preserved at Mudanjiang Railway Station.
SY-0465: is preserved at Sichuan International Tourism Trade Fair Center.
SY-0477: is preserved at Hengdaohezi Locomotive Depot, Mudanjiang.
SY-0514: is preserved at Xiaoyutuo Railway Station, Chongqing.
SY-0516: is preserved at Jiayang National Mine Park Museum.
SY-0590: is preserved at Suifenhe Great Railway House.
SY-0590: is preserved at Jiangyue Road No. 1500, Minhang District, Shanghai.
SY-0652: is preserved at Dalian Modern Museum.
SY-0862: is preserved at Shanghai Chedun Film Base.
SY-0913: is preserved at Guilin, Guangxi.
SY-1000: is preserved at Liuzhou Locomotive and Rolling Stock Works.
SY-1004: is preserved at Shandong Jiaotong University.
SY-1034: is preserved at Lintong Longhai Railway Park (Now renamed SY-1088).
SY-1085: is preserved at China Academy of Railway Sciences.
SY-1096: is preserved at Shenyang Railway Museum.
SY-1504: is preserved at Liuzhou Industrial Museum.
SY-1647m: is preserved at the Belvedere and Delaware River Railway in the US
SY-1658m: is preserved at the Connecticut Valley Railroad in the US
SY-1670: is preserved at Shanghai Institute of Technology.
SY-1701: is preserved at Hangzhou Baita Park.
SY-1702: is preserved at Guilin University of Aerospace Technology.
SY-1748: is preserved at Shanghai Youth Square.

See also 
List of locomotives in China
China Railways JF6
Connecticut Valley Railroad 3025
KORAIL 901

References

Bibliography 

 

2-8-2 locomotives
Steam locomotives of China
Steam locomotives of South Korea
Steam locomotives of the United States
Railway locomotives introduced in 1960
Standard gauge locomotives of China
5 ft gauge locomotives
Standard gauge locomotives of the United States
CRRC Tangshan